Atla palicei is a species of saxicolous (rock-dwelling), crustose lichen in the family Verrucariaceae. Found in Sweden, it was formally described as a new species in 2008 by Sanja Savić and Leif Tibell. The type specimen was collected in the Kärkevagge valley (Kiruna Municipality), where it was found near a stream growing on a west-facing calcareous boulder. The lichen has a blackish-brown, scurfy thallus that is diffusely areolate, and ascospores measuring 43–51 by 23–26 μm.

References

Verrucariales
Lichen species
Lichens described in 2008
Lichens of Northern Europe
Taxa named by Leif Tibell